Rolf Oskar Ewald Günter Herricht (October 5, 1927 – August 23, 1981) was an East German comedian.

Biography

Early life
Herricht graduated from school in 1943 after passing a 'War Abitur', a form of an Abitur designated to free school pupils to be mobilized. In 1945, he was drafted to the Volkssturm and assigned as an anti-aircraft battery assistant.

After the war's end, he began working as property master and stage manager in a theater in his native Magdeburg, while studying acting in a local studio. After completion, he went to appear on the stages of theaters in Salzwedel, Stendal, Staßfurt, Güstrow and also in the Kleist Theater in Frankfurt am Oder.

Breakthrough
Herricht first met fellow actor Hans-Joachim Preil in 1951, while they both worked in Bernburg. The two formed the 'Herricht and Preil' comedy duo, staging their first sketch, 'The Chess Match', in 1953. In the sketch, Preil vainly attempts to play chess with Herricht, who is completely oblivious to the rules of the game. In their act, Herricht played the 'funny man', while Preil served as the 'straight man'. The pair were active until Herricht's passing away.

In 1957, Herricht returned to the Magdeburg Theater, where he remained until 1961. He mainly played comical characters, like the scribe in The Beaver Coat and the drunkard from Auerbach's Cellar in Faust I.

During his time in Magdeburg, he also worked in the radio. He and Preil first performed on television when one of their sketches was broadcast by Deutscher Fernsehfunk in 1959. The show was well received by the audience and the two began making regular appearances on TV. Herricht and Preil became the German Democratic Republic's most celebrated comedians.

Height of career

Herricht made his film debut in DEFA's 1959 comedy Before the Lightning Strikes, playing a minor part of a locomotive constructor. Herricht later appeared in some twenty cinema productions, while also playing in many television films. In 1964, he joined the regular cast of the Metropol Theater in Berlin. He also had a career as a singer.

Herricht appeared on screen in relatively minor roles until writer Maurycy Janowski and director Gottfried Kolditz decided to create a film the plot of which would be based on his comical skill, the 1964 Geliebte weiße Maus. Herricht portrayed a traffic policeman who falls in love with a woman and only dares speak to her when she makes an accident on the road. The picture met with considerable success. Herricht starred in several other popular DEFA comedies during the 1960s and the 1970s: among others, he played the erratic National People's Army reserve soldier Ralf Horricht in the 1965 Der Reserveheld and the last-minute-travel-guide Hurtig in the 1967 Meine Freundin Sybille. His 1965 Hände hoch oder ich schieße, in which he again appeared as an eccentric policeman, was banned at the 11th plenary session of the Socialist Unity Party of Germany and only released in 2009, 28 years after his death.

Herricht was twice awarded the Art Prize of the German Democratic Republic: on 17 May 1973 and on 13 May 1977.

He died of a heart attack at the age of 53, while performing the role of one of the gangsters in Kiss Me, Kate on the stage of the Metropol.  He is buried in Berlin's I Französischer Friedhof.

Filmography

Cinema
 1959: Bevor der Blitz einschlägt
 1959: Musterknaben
 1960: Seilergasse 8
 1961: For Eyes Only
 1962: Auf der Sonnenseite
 1964: Geliebte weiße Maus
 1965: Der Reserveheld
 1965: Nichts als Sünde
 1966/2009: Hände hoch oder ich schieße
 1967: Meine Freundin Sybille
 1968: Hauptmann Florian von der Mühle
 1968: 12 Uhr mittags kommt der Boß
 1969: Mit mir nicht, Madam!
 1969: Der Weihnachtsmann heißt Willi
 1969: Seine Hoheit – Genosse Prinz
 1970: Husaren in Berlin
 1971: Chyornye sukhari
 1972: Der Mann, der nach der Oma kam
 1972: Nicht schummeln, Liebling!
 1977: DEFA Disko 77
 1979: Der Baulöwe

Television
 1959: Wie die Wilden
 1960: Zweimal Madeleine
 1961: Gastspiele im Dschungel
 1961: Kater Lampe
 1961: Bodo Baddy's bunte Bühne
 1962: Was halten Sie von Musik?
 1963: Komm mit mir nach Montevideo
 1965: Muss das sein?
 1966: Drei leichte Fälle
 1969: Tolle Tage
 1970: Der Schein trügt
 1972: Der Mann seiner Frau
 1973: Ein gewisser Katulla
 1974: Schultze mit "tz"
 1974: So eine Frau...
 1974: Alle Haare wieder
 1975: Mein lieber Kokoschinsky
 1976: Keine Hochzeit ohne Ernst (Bunbury)
 1976: Fürs ganze Leben
 1976: Heute Ruhetag
 1976: Frauen sind Männersache
 1976: Maxe Baumann - Ferien ohne Ende
 1977: Umwege ins Glück
 1977: Der rasende Roland
 1977: Ehe man Ehefrau bleibt
 1977: Urlaub nach Prospekt
 1977: Du und icke und Berlin
 1977: Maxe Baumann - Keine Ferien für Max
 1978: Ein Hahn im Korb
 1978: Maxe Baumann - Max auf Reisen
 1979: Maxe Baumann - Überraschung für Max
 1980: Maxe Baumann - Max in Moritzhagen

Singles
Ausgerechnet Blechmusik
Die Eiszeit Kommt Wieder
Die Vielweiberei
Gelber Mond
Ich bin auf den Hund gekommen
Ich bin ein Star des Fußballplatzgesangsvereins
Ich soll stets die Leute nur zum Lachen bringen
Immer dieser Ärger mit den Kleinen )
Klamotten-Rag
Laubenpiepergartenhundefest
Mein grüner Papagei
Oh, dieser Jazz
Wenn Sie mich so anseh'n

References

External links

A collection of 'Herricht & Preil' sketches on MDR.de.

1927 births
1981 deaths
People from Magdeburg
People from the Province of Saxony
German male stage actors
German male film actors
German male television actors
German male comedians
20th-century German male actors
20th-century German male singers
Volkssturm personnel
Recipients of the Art Prize of the German Democratic Republic
Deaths onstage
20th-century comedians
Luftwaffenhelfer